Casse (French pronunciation: [kas]) is a French surname that may refer to the following notable people:
Germain Casse (1837–1900), French journalist
 Jean-Baptiste du Casse (1646–1715), French Navy admiral
Justin Casse, American bloodstock agent
 Mark E. Casse (born 1961), American horse trainer
Matthias Casse (born 1997), Belgian judoka
Mattia Casse (born 1990), Italian alpine ski racer
 Michel Cassé (born 1943), French astrophysicist, writer and poet
Severine Casse (1805–1898), Danish women's rights activist 
 Vincent Casse (born 1994), Belgian acrobatic gymnast

See also
LaCasse 

French-language surnames